Pantydia is a genus of moths in the family Erebidae.

Species
 Pantydia andersoni (Felder & Rogenhofer, 1874)
 Pantydia bicolora (Bethune-Baker, 1906)
 Pantydia canescens Walker, 1869
 Pantydia capistrata Lucas, 1894
 Pantydia diemeni Guenée, 1852
 Pantydia dufayi Laporte, 1975
 Pantydia klossi (Rothschild, 1915)
 Pantydia metaphaea Hampson, 1912
 Pantydia metaspila Walker, [1858]
 Pantydia scissa (Walker, 1865)
 Pantydia sparsa Guenée, 1852

Former species
 Pantydia discisigna (Hampson, 1894) (Anomis)
 Pantydia dochmosticha Turner, 1933
 Pantydia orthosiodes (Walker, 1865)

References

External links
 
 

 
Euclidiini
Moth genera